The Roman Catholic Diocese of Cabimas is a diocese located in the city of Cabimas in the Ecclesiastical province of Maracaibo in Venezuela.

History
On 23 July 1965 Pope Paul VI established the Diocese of Cabimas from the Archdiocese of Maracaibo.

Bishops

Ordinaries
Constantino Maradei Donato † (23 July 1965 – 18 November 1969) Appointed, Bishop of Barcelona
Marco Tulio Ramírez Roa † (31 March 1970 – 26 October 1984) Appointed, Bishop of San Cristóbal de Venezuela
Roberto Lückert León (27 April 1985 – 21 July 1993) Appointed, Bishop of Coro
Freddy Jesús Fuenmayor Suárez (12 March 1994 – 30 December 2004) Appointed, Bishop of Los Teques
William Enrique Delgado Silva (26 July 2005 – 14 September 2018)
Ángel Francisco Caraballo Fermín (29 January 2019 – present)

Other priest of this diocese who became bishop
Nicolás Gregorio Nava Rojas, appointed Bishop of Machiques in 2019

See also
Roman Catholicism in Venezuela

References

External links
 GCatholic.org
 Catholic Hierarchy 

Roman Catholic dioceses in Venezuela
Roman Catholic Ecclesiastical Province of Maracaibo
Christian organizations established in 1965
Roman Catholic dioceses and prelatures established in the 20th century
1965 establishments in Venezuela
Cabimas